Colin Edward Webb  (born 9 December 1937) is a British physicist and former professor at the University of Oxford, specialising in lasers.

Education
Webb was educated at the University of Nottingham (BSc) and Oriel College, Oxford (DPhil).

Career
After working at Bell Labs in Murray Hill, New Jersey, Webb returned to Oxford as a research fellow in physics at the Clarendon Laboratory in 1968, and was appointed to a university lectureship in 1971, becoming reader in 1990 and professor in 1992.  He served as head of Atomic and Laser Physics from 1995 to 1999, and became an emeritus professor in 2002.  Jesus College, Oxford appointed him to a Fellowship in 1973; he became a senior research fellow in 1988 and an emeritus fellow in 2005.  Webb has supervised more than 35 DPhil students.  In 1977, he founded Oxford Lasers a company that began as a manufacturer of high-power copper lasers and that today focuses on high-speed imaging and laser micro-machining technology.

Research
Webb is considered a pioneer in British laser research and has made significant contributions in the areas of hollow cathode metal-vapor lasers,
 copper vapor lasers, high-power copper vapor laser-pumped dye lasers,  and excimer lasers.  His work on hollow-cathode metal-vapor lasers led to the discovery of numerous new laser transition in the visible spectrum.

His publications include (as editor in chief) Handbook of Laser Technology and Applications (2003) as well as various papers on lasers and laser mechanisms in academic journals and specialized books. He has also co-authored a textbook in laser physics in 2010, with Simon Hooker of Oxford.

Awards and honours
Webb was appointed a Member of the Order of the British Empire in 2000.  He was awarded the Duddell Medal and Prize (now called the Gabor Medal and Prize) in 1985 by the Institute of Physics and delivered the Paterson Lecture of the Royal Society in 1999. He won the Richard Glazebrook Medal and Prize in 2001.

He is a Fellow of the Optical Society of America  and was elected a Fellow of the Royal Society (FRS) in 1991 He is also a Fellow of the Institute of Physics.

References

Living people
1937 births
British physicists
English physicists
Experimental physicists
Optical physicists
Laser researchers
Scientists at Bell Labs
Alumni of the University of Nottingham
Alumni of Oriel College, Oxford
Fellows of Jesus College, Oxford
Fellows of the Royal Society
Fellows of Optica (society)
Members of the Order of the British Empire